Tondihal is a village in the Koppal district in Karnataka state, India.

See also
Sidnekoppa
Lakkundi
Halligudi
Kuknoor
Koppal

Villages in Koppal district